The Loganiaceae are a family of flowering plants classified in order Gentianales. The family includes up to 13 genera, distributed around the world's tropics. There are not any great morphological characteristics to distinguish these taxa from others in the order Gentianales.

Many members of the Loganiaceae are extremely poisonous, causing death by convulsion. Poisonous properties are largely due to alkaloids such as those found in Strychnos. Glycosides are also present as loganin in Strychnos.

Earlier treatments of the family have included up to 29 genera. Phylogenetic studies have demonstrated that this broadly defined Loganiaceae was a polyphyletic assemblage, and numerous genera have been removed from Loganiaceae to other families (sometimes in other orders), e.g., Gentianaceae, Gelsemiaceae, Plocospermataceae, Tetrachondraceae, Buddlejaceae, and Gesneriaceae. Some classification schemes, notably Takhtajan's, break the remaining Loganiaceae even further, into as many as four families; Strychnaceae, Antoniaceae, Spigeliaceae and Loganiaceae.

Genera
Some sources indicate the family consists of 13 genera. A more recent study considers some Labordia species synonymous with Geniostoma, resulting in 12 genera in other sources.

Excluded genera

References

 Struwe, L., V. A. Albert, and B. Bremer (1994). "Cladistics and family level classification of the Gentianales". Cladistics 10: 175–205.

External links 
 
 

 
Asterid families